Aída Menezes dos Santos (born 1 March 1937) is a Brazilian athlete. She competed in the women's high jump at the 1964 Summer Olympics, finishing in 4th place. She reached the mark of 1,74 m (5 ft 8 ½ in).

She was born prematurely, the youngest of six siblings, the daughter of an alcoholic bricklayer and a laundress. She lived with his family in Morro do Arroz, a slum in Niterói. During primary school she worked as a maid and studied hungry. She was discovered by Fluminense (Brazilian sports club), in the first competition she won, she was beaten up by his father, who said that a medal doesn’t pay her bills. When she was at Vasco (Brazilian sports club), She didn't go to training because she used the ticket money to buy food.

To attend college, she attended courses in the morning and, worked in the afternoon and trained at night. She graduated in geography, physical education and pedagogy. From 1975 to 1987, she was a professor of physical education at the Fluminense Federal University (UFF).

In that edition of the Summer Olympics, Aída was the only woman in the Brazilian delegation, and only one for athletics. No structure was offered to her: she traveled without a technician and without material to compete. She didn't even have clothes for the Opening Ceremony: she wore a uniform adapted from another competition. Even so, she became the first woman in Brazil to compete in an Olympic final.

References

External links
 

1937 births
Living people
Athletes (track and field) at the 1964 Summer Olympics
Athletes (track and field) at the 1968 Summer Olympics
Brazilian female high jumpers
Brazilian pentathletes
Olympic athletes of Brazil
Place of birth missing (living people)
Pan American Games medalists in athletics (track and field)
Pan American Games bronze medalists for Brazil
Athletes (track and field) at the 1963 Pan American Games
Athletes (track and field) at the 1967 Pan American Games
Athletes (track and field) at the 1971 Pan American Games
Medalists at the 1967 Pan American Games
Medalists at the 1971 Pan American Games
Sportspeople from Niterói